Rock Branch is a  long 1st order tributary to the Haw River, in Guilford County, North Carolina.

Course
Rock Branch rises in a pond on the divide between Rock Branch and Kings Creek at Kings Crossroads, North Carolina in Guilford County. Rock Branch then flows southeast meet the Haw River about 1.5 miles east of Kings Crossroads.

Watershed
Rock Branch drains  of area, receives about 45.9 in/year of precipitation, has a topographic wetness index of 405.25 and is about 37% forested.

Natural History
The Natural Areas Inventory Guilford County, North Carolina and a later addition in 1995 recognized one location of natural significance in the Rock Branch watershed.  The Rock Branch site contains a mature Mesic Mixed Hardwood Forest.

See also
List of rivers of North Carolina

References

Rivers of North Carolina
Rivers of Guilford County, North Carolina